Video the Vote is a nonpartisan grassroots organization launched in 2006 to document problems at the U.S. polls on election day. Video the Vote ensures timely, complete, and accurate reporting of voter suppression and election irregularities by organizing citizen journalists to document elections in their communities.

Background 

Video the Vote was created by Ian Inaba of the Guerrilla News Network, John Wellington Ennis of Shoot First, Inc., and James Rucker of ColorOfChange.org. The three originally sought to provide a platform to help independent filmmakers coordinate their efforts on election day—documenting election problems and pushing those stories into the mainstream media. The idea morphed into a populist program where ordinary people could participate. They'd simply agree to be on-call to document any Election Day problems that arise in their area; the only requirements being having a digital video recorder, a cell phone, and broadband Internet access, and agreeing to respect governing election law. In 2006, Video the Vote was active in the following states: Arizona, 
California, Colorado, Connecticut, District of Columbia, Florida, Maryland, Missouri, New Jersey, New York, Ohio, Pennsylvania,  Tennessee, Texas, and Virginia.

Organizations Involved 

presente.org
ColorOfChange
Ustream
Mother Jones
Vote Riders
18MillionRising.org
Election Protection
MoveOn.org
RockTheVote
National Organization for Women
Brennan Center For Justice
The Leadership Conference
Lawyers Committee on Civil Rights Under Law

External links 
Video the Vote 2012 at videothevote.org
"Gifts From 2006 to the Next Election", Bill Marsh New York Times, November 11, 2006
'Video the Vote' Effort Seeks Foothold All Things Considered, NPR, October 28, 2006.
"This Time, the Election Will Not Be Stolen", Gary Moskowitz, WireTap Magazine, October 31, 2006.
"Election Boosts Trusts in US voting systems" Ben Arnoldy and Ari Pinkus, Christian Science Monitor, November 10, 2006.

Political advocacy groups in the United States
Organizations established in 2006
2006 elections in the United States